This topic listsracquetball events for 2015.

 June 21, 2014 – June 19, 2015: 2014–2015 International Racquetball Tour

Tier 1 and grand slam events
 September 18–21, 2014: Krowning Moment Bobcat Open in  San Marcos, Texas
  Kane Waselenchuk defeated  Rocky Carson 11–8, 7–11, 11–3, 11–2.
 September 25–28, 2014: Novasors Kansas City Open in  Kansas City, Kansas
  Kane Waselenchuk defeated  Rocky Carson 11–5, 11–2, 11–2.
 October 8–12, 2014: US Open Racquetball Championships in  Minneapolis
  Kane Waselenchuk defeated  Álvaro Beltrán 11–6, 11–1, 11–6.
 October 16–19, 2014: Pete Pierce's St. Louis Party with the Pros in  Saint Louis
  Rocky Carson defeated  Álvaro Beltrán 11–8, 11–9, 8–11, 11–6.
 November 6–9, 2014: Red Swain Shootout in  Davison, Michigan
  Rocky Carson defeated  Álvaro Beltrán 12–10, 11–3, 4–11, 11–2.
 November 13–16, 2014: 24th Annual Turkey Shootout in  Garden City, Kansas
  Rocky Carson defeated  Ben Croft 11–7, 9–11, 11–4, 11–9.
 December 11–14, 2014: ROLLOUT New Jersey Open in  Warren
  Daniel De La Rosa defeated  Álvaro Beltrán 11–4, 11–6, 9–11, 12–10.
 January 15–18, 2015: NY Temperature Controls IRT Pro/Am in  Long Island City
  Kane Waselenchuk defeated  Rocky Carson 11–4, 11–7, 11–6.
 January 22–25, 2015: Lewis Drug Pro/Am in  Sioux Falls, South Dakota
  Kane Waselenchuk defeated  Rocky Carson 11–5, 11–5, 11–1.
 February 26 – March 1, 2015: Florida IRT ProAm in  Sarasota, Florida
  Kane Waselenchuk defeated  Rocky Carson 11–8, 11–8, 14–12.
 March 12–15, 2015: 30th Annual Shamrock Shootout & IRT ProAm in  Lombard, Illinois
  Kane Waselenchuk defeated  Rocky Carson 11–8, 11–5, 11–3
 April 9–11, 2015: Long Beach Open Doubles in  Long Beach, California
  Álvaro Beltrán/ Rocky Carson defeated  Daniel De La Rosa/ Jose Rojas 15–4, 15–6.
 April 30 – May 3, 2015: Krowning Moment Pro Invitational Internacional in  Edinburg, Texas
  Kane Waselenchuk defeated  Rocky Carson 11–4, 11–1, 11–3
 May 14–17, 2015: Pro Kennex Tournament of Champions in  Portland, Oregon
  Kane Waselenchuk defeated  Daniel De La Rosa 11–4, 11–1, 11–2

Tier 1 and grand slam events
 August 15, 2014 – May 17, 2015: 2014–2015 Women's Pro tour
 August 15–17, 2014: Torneo Fenapo 2014 Paola Longoria in  San Luis Potosí
  Paola Longoria defeated  Maria Jose Vargas 11–6, 12–10, 11–2.
  Paola Longoria / Samantha Salas defeated  Michelle Key /  Frédérique Lambert 4–15, 15–10, 11–2.
 September 11–14, 2014: 3WallBall World Championships in  Las Vegas
  Janel Tisinger defeated  Jessica Parrilla 15–10, 15–10.
  Michelle Key / Rhonda Rajsich defeated  Jackie Paraiso /  Jessica Parrilla 15–14, 12–15, 11–4.
 September 19–21, 2014:Albiertos Mexicano de Raquetas in  Huixquilucan de Degollado
  Paola Longoria defeated  Maria Jose Vargas 11–8, 2–11, 11–3, 11–7. 
 October 8–12, 2014: UnitedHealthcare US Open in  Minneapolis
  Paola Longoria defeated  Maria Jose Vargas 11–5, 11–3, 11–8.
  Paola Longoria /  Veronica Sotomayor defeated  Maria Jose Vargas /  Rhonda Rajsich 15–7, 12–15, 11–7.
 October 17–19, 2014: Ektelon Stockton Pro-Am in  Stockton, California
  Rhonda Rajsich defeated  Paola Longoria 11–9, 5–11, 14–12, 5–11, 11–4.
 December 5–7, 2014: Paola Longoria Invitational in  Monterrey
  Paola Longoria defeated  Rhonda Rajsich 11–4, 11–9, 11–5.
  Paola Longoria / Samantha Salas defeated  Maria Paz Munoz / Veronica Sotomayor 15–10, 15–14.
 December 12–14, 2014: 23rd Annual Christmas Classic in  Arlington County, Virginia
  Maria Jose Vargas defeated  Rhonda Rajsich 5–11, 11–7, 11–7, 13–11.
  Maria Jose Vargas /  Rhonda Rajsich defeated  Alexandra Herrera / Samantha Salas 11–15, 15–7, 11–7.
 January 23–25, 2015: Mercedes-Benz of Cincinnati Pro-Am in  Cincinnati
  Paola Longoria defeated  Maria Jose Vargas 12–10, 11–7, 11–5.
  Paola Longoria / Samantha Salas defeated  Maria Jose Vargas /  Rhonda Rajsich 15–9, 12–15, 11–9.
 February 20–22, 2015: Winter Classic Presented by NextPage in  Overland Park, Kansas
  Paola Longoria defeated  Rhonda Rajsich 11–1, 11–2, 11–4.
 March 6–8, 2015: ROLLOUT New Jersey Open in  Warren County, New Jersey
  Maria Jose Vargas defeated  Frédérique Lambert 7–11, 11–6, 11–7, 11–3.
 March 20–22, 2015: California/Nevada State Singles in  Fountain Valley, California
  Paola Longoria defeated  Maria Jose Vargas 11–6, 11–6, 11–6.
  Paola Longoria / Samantha Salas defeated  Cristina Amaya /  Sophia Rascon 15–12, 15–13.
 April 3–5, 2015: AZ WOR VII – The Final Battle in  Glendale, Arizona
 Winner:  Michelle Key
 April 16–19, 2015: Mile High Pro Am in  Denver
  Paola Longoria defeated  Maria Jose Vargas 11–9, 11–1, 11–1.
 April 24–26, 2015: Battle at the Alamo in  San Antonio
  Paola Longoria defeated  Maria Jose Vargas 11–7, 11–9, 5–11, 11–2.
  Paola Longoria / Samantha Salas defeated  Michelle Key /  Frédérique Lambert.

Continental championships
 March 21 & 22: 2015 Asia Racquetball Championships in  Goyang
 March April 28–4: Racquetball PARC American Championships 2015 in  Santo Domingo
 Men's Singles:  Jose Diaz
 Women's Singles:  Paola Longoria
 Men's Doubles:  Álvaro Beltrán / Javier Moreno
 Women's Doubles:  Paola Longoria / Samantha Salas
 June 22–27: European Championships in  Hamburg
 Men's winner:  Oliver Bertels
 Women's winner:  Andrea Gordon
 Women's Doubles winners:  Andrea Gordon/Lara Ludwig
 Men's Doubles winners:  Arne Schmitz/Oliver Bertels

References

 
Racquetball by year
racquetball